Florian Morizot (born 10 May 1985 in Dijon) is a French former road cyclist, who competed professionally between 2006 and 2010.

Major results

2004
 1st  Time trial, National Under-23 Road Championships
 2nd Chrono Champenois
2005
 1st  Overall Circuit des Ardennes
1st  Points classification
1st Stage 3 (ITT)
 3rd Time trial, National Under-23 Road Championships
2006
 National Under-23 Road Championships
1st  Road race
2nd Time trial
 5th Chrono Champenois
2007
 1st Grand Prix Cristal Energie
2008
 1st Paris–Mantes-en-Yvelines
 3rd Overall Tour du Poitou Charentes
1st Stage 4 (ITT)
 8th Duo Normand
 10th Chrono des Nations
2009
 5th Chrono des Nations
 5th Chrono Champenois
2010
 3rd Overall Circuit des Ardennes

References

1985 births
Living people
French male cyclists
Sportspeople from Dijon
Cyclists from Bourgogne-Franche-Comté